Irving Leslie Halter Jr. is a retired Air Force Major General and a member of the Democratic Party. He ran for the United States House of Representatives in Colorado's 5th congressional district in the 2014 elections.

Personal life and education
A native of New Jersey, Halter graduated from Woodstown High School in 1973. Halter graduated from the Air Force Academy in 1977, majoring in history. He was a distinguished graduate of the Air Command and Staff College at Maxwell Air Force Base, and in 1990 earned an M.S. degree in international relations from Troy State University.

Military career
After graduating from the Air Force Academy, Halter served as a fighter pilot. He served in eight different fighter units in the Pacific, Europe, and the United States. Halter would hold high positions in the Pentagon and the National Reconnaissance Office, and was the vice superintendent of the Air Force Academy. Halter served in both Iraq and Afghanistan, and was awarded the Distinguished Service Medal and the National Intelligence Medal of Achievement. Halter was awarded the Bronze Star twice. His last military assignment was with the Joint Chiefs of Staff.

After retiring from the military, Halter became vice president of space and aviation programs at Computer Sciences Corporation. Halter serves on the board of the Military Affairs Committee of the Colorado Springs Regional Business Alliance. Halter has appeared on NPR, discussing precision weapons and air strikes.

2014 Congressional candidacy and Colorado Dept of Local Affairs
Halter ran for Congress in Colorado's 5th congressional district. The 5th district is home to the Air Force Academy, Fort Carson, Schriever Air Force Base, and Petersen Air Force Base. Halter was a Republican, but became an independent and later a Democrat. Of his party affiliation, he says, "I didn't leave the Republican Party. The Republican Party left me. What disturbs me about the Republican Party is it's become the party of 'My way or the highway.' It's all about a certain doctrine and if you don't adhere to that doctrine, you're called names." He lost the election to incumbent Doug Lamborn.

In April 2015, Halter was appointed as Executive Director of Colorado Department of Local Affairs by Governor John Hickenlooper and served in that cabinet-level position until January 2019. The department was responsible for assisting local communities and counties through professional administrative advice and substantial monetary grants for infrastructure. The department also served as the State Housing Authority channeling Federal and State investments into low income housing and permanent supportive housing for those experiencing homelessness.

References

Living people
Politicians from Colorado Springs, Colorado
United States Air Force Academy alumni
Troy University alumni
Colorado Democrats
Colorado Republicans
United States Air Force generals
Woodstown High School alumni
People from Salem County, New Jersey
Year of birth missing (living people)
Military personnel from New Jersey
Military personnel from Colorado